Joossesweg is a neighbourhood of Westkapelle in the Dutch province of Zeeland. It is a part of the municipality of Veere. It is a bungalow park near the sea.

References
 

Populated places in Zeeland
Veere